Kevin Phillips may refer to:

Kevin Phillips (actor) (born 1981), American actor
Kevin Phillips (Australian footballer) (1928–2018), Australian footballer for Collingwood
Kevin Phillips (English footballer) (born 1973), former Sunderland and England football player
Kevin Phillips (political commentator) (born 1940), American political commentator and writer
Kevin Phillips (politician) (1954–2017), Canadian politician
Kevin Phillips (rugby union) (born 1961), Wales international rugby union player